Concepción is a city & district in northern Paraguay and capital of the Concepción Department. It lies next to the Paraguay River.

Founded by a Spanish Governor, named Agustín Fernado de Pinedo, the town prospered in the early years of the 20th century, as a centre for the north of the country, exploiting the new wealth of the Gran Chaco, and a river port. The town was also a centre for the Paraguayan Civil War of 1947. The city is the seat of the Roman Catholic Diocese of Concepción en Paraguay.

Transportation
Route 5 "Gral. Bernardino Caballero" connects the city with Pedro Juan Caballero and Asunción.

Climate

Concepción has a tropical savanna climate (Köppen: Aw) with abundant annual precipitation, although possessing a highly prominent summer peak. Summers are very hot, rainy and often oppressively humid. Severe thunderstorms are very common in the summer, and have the capability to dump copious amounts of rainfall in a short period of time, along with destructively high winds and occasional hail. Winter is much drier and considerably cooler, with near drought-like conditions often prevailing. Concepcion is also located in very close proximity to the Tropic of Capricorn, with the latitudinal line lying just south of the city.

Notes

References

Sources

World Gazeteer: Paraguay  – World-Gazetteer.com

Populated places in Concepción Department, Paraguay
Populated places established in 1773